Cheema Khurd is a village in Phillaur in Jalandhar district of Punjab State, India. In the Persian language, Kalan is translated as 'big' and Khurd is translated as 'small'. Cheema Khurd is situated beside Cheema Kalan.
The village is administrated by Sarpanch, an elected representative of the village.

Demography 
, the village has a total number of 240 houses and the population of 1105 of which 550 are males while 555 are females.  According to the report published by Census India in 2011, out of the total population of the village 521 people are from Schedule Caste and the village does not have any Schedule Tribe population so far.
Dutch international cricketer Vikramjit Singh was born in the village.

Notable People 

 Vikramjit Singh – Netherlands Cricketer

See also
List of villages in India

References

External links 
 Tourism of Punjab
 Census of Punjab

Villages in Jalandhar district